I Believe in Music may refer to:

 "I Believe in Music" (song), a 1970 song by Mac Davis and 1972 hit by Gallery
 I Believe in Music (album), a 1970 album by Mac Davis
 I Believe in Music (Louis Jordan album), 1973